Cyrtandra laxiflora is a species of flowering plant in the family Gesneriaceae, native to Hawaii. It is only found on the windward side of Oʻahu.

References

laxiflora
Endemic flora of Hawaii
Plants described in 1867
Flora without expected TNC conservation status